Voodoo is the first studio album by the South Korean boy band VIXX. It was released on November 25, 2013 under the label of Jellyfish Entertainment. It features two singles, with the track "Voodoo Doll" being the last promoted.

Promotion
VIXX first performed "Voodoo Doll" live during their Milky Way Global Showcase finale concert in Seoul which took place on November 17, 2013. The first broadcast performance of "Voodoo Doll" was shown on November 20 through a televised premiere of VIXX's finale concert on SBS MTV. Later that same day, VIXX had their first comeback stage on MBC Music's Show Champion, performing both "Only U" and "Voodoo Doll". On December 6, the group won their first music show award on Music Bank with "Voodoo Doll".

Singles

"Only U"
"Only U" (lit. "Because You're the Answer") served as a pre-release single. It was produced by songwriter Shinsadong Tiger, and co-produced by 4Beontaja and Jellyfish Entertainment CEO Hwang Se-jun. Shinsadong Tiger and 4Beontaja arranged the song. VIXX's rapper Ravi teamed up with writer Kim Ji-hyang to write the lyrics.

The music video for the song was directed by Hong Won Ki and filmed in Stockholm in Sweden, capturing the beautiful scenery of the country. The single peaked at number 40 on the Gaon Singles Chart, and number 18 on the Social Chart.

"Voodoo Doll"

"Voodoo Doll" (lit. "Curse Doll) is the album's lead single. "Voodoo Doll" was written by songwriter Kim Eana and Ravi (who wrote the rap portion of the song)  and composed by  Hyuk Shin, who has produced songs such as SHINee's "Dream Girl" and EXO's "Growl". The song's music video was directed by ZanyBros.

The music video was released on November 19, 2013. Filmed in the style of a horror movie, it opens with graphic images of organs and flesh being cut, stabbed, and stapled together. The mutilated members are imprisoned in individual chambers. Their female captor gleefully controls and tortures them through the voodoo doll. The members escape, but Hongbin is recaptured. In the end, he completely transforms into a voodoo doll.

Because of the disturbing imagery and violence, both the music video and choreography were censored. The music video failed to meet the regulations and was designated with an R rating. A clean version was later released on November 24, 2013. The choreography to "Voodoo Doll" incorporated a staff that “stabbed” the members at various points. The major networks banned the choreography, citing it was too violent. Their company expressed disappointment stating, “The part that was a problem is where the VIXX members turn into voodoo dolls. The choreography is symbolic of the voodoo doll's sad fate.”  The choreography was eventually modified for broadcast.  
  
The single peaked at number 7 on the Gaon Singles Chart and number 53 on Billboard's K-Pop Hot 100. It also charted at number 3 on the Gaon Social Chart.

Track listing
The credits are adapted from the official homepage of the group.

Release history

Chart performance

Album

Singles

Awards and nominations

Awards

Music program awards

See also
 List of Gaon Album Chart number ones of 2013

References

External links
 
 
 
 ONLY U - Single on iTunes
 Voodoo on iTunes

2013 debut albums
VIXX albums
Jellyfish Entertainment albums
Stone Music Entertainment albums
Korean-language albums